Mi secreto (English title: My Secret) is a Mexican telenovela that aired on Las Estrellas from 12 September 2022 to 24 February 2023. The series is produced by Carlos Moreno for TelevisaUnivision. It is based on the 1974 Mexican telenovela Ha llegado una intrusa created by Marissa Garrido. It stars Macarena García, Isidora Vives, Diego Klein and Andrés Baida.

Plot 
Valeria (Macarena García) is forced to take the identity of her best friend Natalia (Isidora Vives), whom she believes to be dead, in order to avoid going to jail for a crime she did not commit. As she assumes her new reality, Valeria suffers constantly from the fear of being discovered by Natalia's family, by the police, but mainly by Mateo (Diego Klein), the man she loves and who is unaware that she is an impostor.

Cast 
 Diego Klein as Mateo Miranda
 Nicolás Villagrana as child Mateo
 Macarena García as Valeria Bernal
 Ana Paula Cachoua as child Valeria
 Karyme Lozano as Daniela Estrada
 Arturo Peniche as Ernesto Lascuráin
 Isidora Vives as Natalia Ugarte Moncada
 Valentina Galiano as child Natalia
 Andrés Baida as Rodrigo Carvajal
 Rodrigo Vargas as child Rodrigo
 Claudia Ramírez as Fedra Espinoza
 Lizy Martínez as young Fedra
 Fernando Ciangherotti as Alfonso Ugarte
 Kuno Becker as young Alfonso
 Alma Delfina as Elena Mendoza
 Evangelina Sosa as young Elena
 Luis Felipe Tovar as Hilario Miranda
 Alejandro Valencia as young Hilario
 Vanessa Bauche as Carmita Rivero de Carvajal
 Sharon Gaytan as young Carmita
 Luis Fernando Peña as Joaquín Carvajal
 Eric del Castillo as Father David
 Chris Pazcal as Gabino Ocampo
 Ana Paula Martínez as Constanza Carvajal
 Daniela Martínez as Melissa Riberol
 Laura Vignatti as Inés Guzmán
 Mauricio Abularach as Bermúdez
 Lalo Palacios as Luis Aguirre Mendoza
 Jorge Alanís as teen Luis
 Adrián Escalona as Lalo Carvajal
 Iker Vallín as child Lalo
 Rocío Reyna as Fabiola Carvajal
 Cosette as child Fabiola
 Susana Jímenez as Sofía
 Ruy Gaytán as Julián
 Ramsés Alemán as Iker Carrera

Recurring and guest stars 
 Alejandra Jurado as Juana
 Arturo Vinales as Felipe
 Solkin Ruz as Tony
 Alejandra Andreu as Álvarez
 Fernando Manzano as Duarte
 Ana Layevska as Mariana
 Erick García Rojas as Lucio
 Juan Luis Arias as Javier
 Priscila Solorio as Gaby
 Mateo Camacho as Eugenio
 Paola Toyos as Tania
 Amy Nicole as Itzel
 Amaranta Ruiz as Dalila

Production 
In February 2022, it was reported that it was reported that Carlos Moreno would be producing a new version of the 1974 telenovela Ha llegado una intrusa, with the working title being La impostora. On 15 June 2022, Macarena García, Isidora Vives, Diego Klein and Andrés Baida were announced in the lead roles, with the title being changed to Mi secreto. Filming of the telenovela began on 5 July 2022. On 17 October 2022, it was announced that the telenovela would be divided into two parts, to be aired without interruption. The second part premiered on 30 November 2022. Filming concluded on 21 December 2022.

Ratings

Episodes

Notes

References

External links 
 

2022 telenovelas
2022 Mexican television series debuts
2022 Mexican television series endings
2020s Mexican television series
Televisa telenovelas
Mexican telenovelas
Spanish-language telenovelas